Mohan Bhaira Memorial Award is an award constituted by the Nalbari district unit of All Assam Students' Union and Nalbari Zila Unnati Sabha. This award ceremony held on February 1 coinciding with the death anniversary of Sangeet Natak Akademi Award-winning Bhaona artist Mohan Chandra Barman, better known as Mohan Bhaira after whom the award has been named after. It is being conferred for outstanding contribution in folk arts and specially reserved for the folk artistes of rural areas. 

It was started in 2009 and Purnya Prava Dutta Tamuly was first awardee. Flautist Harekrishna Talukdar who received this award in 2021 is last awardee. This award was not declared in 2019 and 2020 due to the Citizenship Amendment Act protests and COVID-19 pandemic respectively. 

The award carries a cash prize of ₹10000, a shawl (Seleng sadar), a Jaapi and a Gamosa.

Recipients

References

Civil awards and decorations of Assam